Varenne-Saint-Germain is a commune in the Saône-et-Loire department in the region of Bourgogne-Franche-Comté in eastern France.

Geography
Varenne-Saint-Germain is bordered by the Digoin commune to the north, Vitry-en-Charollais to the east, Saint-Yan to the south and Chassenard to the west. The Arconce flows north-northwest through the middle of the commune, then flows into the Loire, which forms parts of the commune's western border.

History
In 1793, during the French Revolution, Reuillon, hamlet of Varennes-Reuillon, was renamed to La Montagne. During the Second World War, the commune was crossed by the demarcation line; the remains of a border post are still present on the road D982. The commune of Varenne-Saint-Germain was created in 1973 by merging the communes of Saint-Germain-des-Rives and Varenne-Reuillon.

Demographics
In 2018, the commune had 718 inhabitants, an increase of 5.43% compared to 2013.

Sights
 Château de Pontamailly, former property of Nicolas du Bessey de Contenson (who had bought the barony of Pontamailly in 1771). The remains of the castle were largely rebuilt in 1875. 
 La Motte-Reuillon castle mound, whose central platform measures about 30 meters in diameter and where the remains of a tower remain.

See also
Communes of the Saône-et-Loire department

References

Communes of Saône-et-Loire